Qasem Abdulhamed Burhan (born on December 15, 1985) is a Qatari footballer. He currently plays as a goalkeeper for Al Gharrafa .

International
Burhan is born and raised in Senegal, but early in his career moved to Qatar, and became a naturalized citizen. He is a member of the Qatar national football team. He was given his international debut against Bahrain in the 2004 by caretaker coach Saeed Al-Misnad. He was Qatar's first choice goalkeeper in the 2011 Asian Cup.

He won Goalkeeper of the tournament in the 2014 Gulf Cup of Nations held in Saudi Arabia, having succeeded in winning the title over Oman's Ali Al-Habsi who consecutively won the last four Goalkeeper of the tournament titles in the tournament. He was selected in Qatar's 2015 Asian Cup squad despite having a torrid record with Al Gharafa in the league during the 2014–15 season.

Honors

Club
Al Khor
Qatar Crown Prince Cup: 2005

Al Rayyan
Emir of Qatar Cup: 2004, 2006

Al Gharafa
Qatar Stars League: 2008, 2009, 2010
Emir of Qatar Cup: 2009, 2012
Qatar Crown Prince Cup: 2010, 2011
Qatari Stars Cup: 2018, 2019

Lekhwiya
Qatar Stars League: 2017

International
Qatar
Gulf Cup of Nations: 2014

Club career statistics
Statistics accurate as of 26 November 2022

1Includes Emir of Qatar Cup.

2Includes Sheikh Jassem Cup.

3Includes AFC Champions League.

References

External links

Goalzz.com profile

1985 births
Living people
Qatari footballers
Qatar international footballers
Qatar youth international footballers
Senegalese footballers
2004 AFC Asian Cup players
Al-Khor SC players
Al-Rayyan SC players
2011 AFC Asian Cup players
2015 AFC Asian Cup players
Association football goalkeepers
Qatar Stars League players
Senegalese emigrants to Qatar
Naturalised citizens of Qatar
Footballers from Dakar
Al-Gharafa SC players
Lekhwiya SC players
Qatari people of Senegalese descent
Asian Games medalists in football
Footballers at the 2006 Asian Games
Asian Games gold medalists for Qatar
Medalists at the 2006 Asian Games